Max Cady is a fictional character and the primary antagonist of the John D. MacDonald novel The Executioners. He was portrayed by Robert Mitchum in Cape Fear and Robert De Niro in Martin Scorsese's remake.

Character overview

In both film versions of MacDonald's novel, Cady is a criminal with an obsessive grudge against an attorney named Sam Bowden (played by Gregory Peck in the first film and by Nick Nolte in the remake) who sent him to prison for rape. While in prison, Cady teaches himself to read as he nurtures his hatred of Bowden, made especially intense when his wife divorces him and takes their child. Upon his release, he terrorizes Bowden and his family, stalking his wife at their house and attempting to seduce Bowden's teenaged daughter. After Bowden's failed attempts to get rid of Cady with bribery and a restraining order, he hires street thugs to rough Cady up, which only succeeds in making him angrier and more determined to make sure Bowden "learns all about loss". Cady tracks the family to its summer home in the titular North Carolina beach town of Cape Fear and nearly kills them all. In the climax of the first film, Bowden puts Cady under citizen's arrest; in the second, Cady drowns after a fight with Bowden.

Differences between the films
Significant differences are seen between the way in which Cady is portrayed in the original film and the remake. (De Niro's portrayal takes influences both from Mitchum's Cady and his equally iconic villain Harry Powel from The Night of the Hunter.) Mitchum's characterization is that of a sleazy, degenerate con artist, while De Niro's is of a homicidal sociopath, who viciously attacks everything and everyone Bowden holds dear (he even beats, mutilates and rapes a woman who is in love with Bowden). The remake also sheds some light on Cady's background, revealing he grew up in a rural Pentecostal family who handled snakes and drank strychnine to achieve religious ecstasy.

Also, many differences occur in the films' portrayals of Cady and Bowden's relationship. In the first film, Bowden merely testified against Cady in court. In the remake, Bowden was Cady's attorney who deliberately suppressed evidence that may have lightened Cady's sentence or granted him an acquittal. Most notably, Cady's fate differs in the two films. In the 1962 version, Bowden manages to grab his revolver and shoot Cady in the shoulder during a fight between the two men. Rather than finish him off, Bowden spares Cady so he will be forced to spend the rest of his life in jail.

In the remake, Bowden is able to handcuff Cady's ankle to a railing in the houseboat before it hits submerged rocks and begins to break apart. The two exchange blows with rocks, and Bowden savagely attempts to bring a large rock down on Cady's head. Before he can do so, though, Cady is washed out into the river, still cuffed to part of the houseboat, madly crying out and speaking in tongues, and Bowden then watches as Cady is pulled to the bottom of the river and drowns.

Differences between the book and the films

In the novel by John D. MacDonald, Sam Bowden testified against Max Cady back in World War II, since he witnessed the latter raping a fourteen-year-old girl when he was stationed in Australia. Cady was sentenced to life at a hard labor prison camp but was released thirteen years later. Cady nurtured his grudge against Bowden during his time which was exacerbated due to his wife divorcing him and his only son dying in an accident. Unlike in the films, Cady refers to Bowden as "lieutenant" instead of "counselor".

Cady's background differs from the films in that he hails from West Virginia and has three brothers, all of whom were criminals (with one killed during a prison riot). They are not religious zealots like in the 1991 film. However, in the book, Cady is very much a violent psychopath who has no remorse for anything he does which includes, among many other despicable acts, shooting one of Bowden's children with a rifle. He is determined to kill Bowden "six times".

Cady's fate in the book is being shot by Bowden as he flees from their home after attacking Bowden's wife. In the wee hours of the morning during a police search, his body is found in the woods behind the Bowden home. He died of excessive blood loss from two of Bowden's shots.

Cultural impact
Mitchum's portrayal of Cady ranks number 28 on the American Film Institute's list of the top 50 movie villains of all time.
Cady was parodied in a 1993 episode of The Simpsons entitled "Cape Feare", in which Sideshow Bob stalks the Simpson family to a lake town to get revenge on Bart.
De Niro's portrayal of Cady was the inspiration for professional wrestler Dan Spivey's Waylon Mercy character in 1995.
Windham Rotunda, another professional wrestler, portrayed a character named Bray Wyatt, who was also loosely modeled after De Niro's version of the character.

References

External links

Characters in American novels of the 20th century
Fictional characters from North Carolina
Fictional murderers
Fictional rapists
Fictional serial killers
Fictional stalkers
Literary characters introduced in 1957
Male literary villains
Thriller film characters